Thomas J. Hayes III (August 26, 1914 – March 16, 2004) was a United States Army Major General.

Early life and education
He started at West Point in 1932 graduating as a Second Lieutenant in 1936.

Military service
Following graduation from West Point Hayes obtained a master's degree in civil engineering from Massachusetts Institute of Technology. He attended the Engineer School and was then posted to the 20th Engineer Regiment at Fort Benning.

World War II
At the outbreak of World War II he was overseeing the construction of Bluie West Eight air base in Greenland. In 1942 he was transferred to Nassau, Bahamas to oversee the construction of Oakes Field and Windsor Field.

Postwar
In 1960, now a Brigadier General, he was appointed commander of the Ballistic Missile Construction Office, responsible for the construction of ICBM support and launch facilities across the U.S.

In 1961, Hayes was awarded the Goethals Medal.

He served as assistant to the Chief of Engineers for NASA Support and was involved in the construction of facilities at the Kennedy Space Center.

During the buildup of U.S. forces to meet the demands of the Vietnam War and the consequential demand for support services and infrastructure in South Vietnam, Hayes noted that "supporting units seem to bear more than their share of losses as a nation progressively reduces its Armed Forces in the years between wars".

He served as commander of the South Atlantic Division from 1967 until his retirement in 1969.

Later life
Hayes retired from the Army in August 1969.

In October 1981, Hayes and Jan Howard, who had also lost a son in Vietnam, publicly unveiled the model of the winning design for the Vietnam Veterans Memorial.

Personal life
He married Jean Pedley in 1942 in Nassau. They had two daughters and a son. His son, Thomas J. Hayes IV, was killed in action in South Vietnam on 17 April 1968 while serving with the 1st Squadron, 4th Cavalry Regiment.

References

1914 births
2004 deaths
United States Army generals
Recipients of the Distinguished Service Medal (US Army)